The South Branch Schoolhouse is a historic building at 2120 South Branch Road in Branchburg, Somerset County, New Jersey. It was built in 1873 with Late Victorian / Italianate style. The schoolhouse was added to the National Register of Historic Places on March 30, 2005 for its significance in architecture and education.

References

External links
 
 

Branchburg, New Jersey	
National Register of Historic Places in Somerset County, New Jersey
School buildings on the National Register of Historic Places in New Jersey
New Jersey Register of Historic Places
1873 establishments in New Jersey
Italianate architecture in New Jersey
One-room schoolhouses in New Jersey
School buildings completed in 1873